The Savannah River point (also, Savannah River Stemmed or Appalachian Stemmed) is a Late Archaic period projectile point commonly found in the southeastern United States. The point is large, triangular, and has a square stem. It is relatively thin for its size. Savannah River points are 44 to 170 mm long, 35 to 70 mm wide, and 7 to 12 mm thick. A Small Savannah River point, a Cattle Run variant, an Otarre Stemmed variant, and a short-stemmed variant have also been described. The type was first described based on finds at Stallings Island. The points were formed by percussion flaking and finished using pressure flaking.

References

Projectile points
Archaic period in North America